Bunting Place, also known as Mapp Farm and Nickawampus Farm, is a historic home and farm located at Wachapreague, Accomack County, Virginia.

History 
The farm was built about 1826.

It was added to the National Register of Historic Places in 2003.

Description 
The farm is a two-story, five-bay, brick-ended frame house.

It sits on a raised Flemish bond brick foundation with cellar, and has a medium pitched gable roof. The house has Federal style details.

Attached to the main block is a -story frame wing that provided original service to the house and serves presently as a modern kitchen. Attached to the wing are two additional sections extending the main block in a stepped or telescope form. Also on the property are a contributing gable-front frame barn and a rectangular frame corn house, as well as a small family cemetery with four burials.

References

Houses on the National Register of Historic Places in Virginia
Federal architecture in Virginia
Houses completed in 1826
National Register of Historic Places in Accomack County, Virginia
1826 establishments in Virginia
Houses in Accomack County, Virginia